Green Hill Park is a large public park in Worcester, Massachusetts. It is home to the Massachusetts Vietnam Veterans' Memorial, which honors veterans of the Vietnam War from Massachusetts. The Memorial was opened in June 2002. It is home to the Green Hill Park Shelter, an historic building on the National Register of Historic Places.

References

Parks in Worcester, Massachusetts